KBRB is the call name of two radio stations licensed in Ainsworth, Nebraska to Sandhills Broadcasting LLC. They air a classic hits format on 92.7 FM and a country music format on 1400 AM. The AM station programming is also heard on translator K292HE, on 106.3 FM.  Programming includes local news, agricultural news, CBS Radio News via Westwood One, Nebraska Cornhuskers sports via the Husker Sports Network, local high school sports, and a variety of country and classic hits.

External links

BRB
Radio stations established in 1975